is a Japanese march composed by Hajime Fuse with lyrics by Masanori Yokoyama.  It was released on 10 May 1939.

History 
A contest for "Taiheiyō Kōshinkyoku" was held on 9 February 1939.  28,105 entries for lyrics were received, with Yokoyama's entry being declared the winner.  Ryū Amaguchi, Issaku Honma and Yutaka Itō placed second, third and fourth, respectively.

References 

Japanese-language songs

1939 songs
Japanese marches
Japanese patriotic songs